James Edward Carter  (born 19 August 1948) is an English actor, best known for his role as Mr Carson in the ITV historical drama series Downton Abbey (2010–2015), which earned him four nominations for the Primetime Emmy Award for Outstanding Supporting Actor in a Drama Series (2012–2015). He reprised the role in the feature films Downton Abbey (2019) and Downton Abbey: A New Era (2022) and starred as the main villain Rookery in The Little Vampire and its 2017 remake.

Carter's films include A Private Function (1984), The Company of Wolves (1984), A Month in the Country (1987), The Witches (1990), A Dangerous Man: Lawrence After Arabia (1992), Stalin (1992), The Madness of King George (1994), Richard III (1995), Brassed Off (1996), Shakespeare in Love (1998), Ella Enchanted (2004), The Thief Lord (2006), The Golden Compass (2007), Tim Burton's Alice in Wonderland (2010), My Week with Marilyn (2011), Transformers: The Last Knight (2017), and The Good Liar (2019).

His television credits include Lipstick on Your Collar (1993), Cracker (1994), The Way We Live Now (2001), The Singing Detective (1986), Minder (1994), Arabian Nights (2000), The Chest (1997), Red Riding (2009), A Very British Coup (1988), the Hornblower episode "Duty" (2003) and the Midsomer Murders episode "The Fisher King" (2004), and Dinotopia (2002). He also plays Captain Brown in the five-part BBC series Cranford (2007) alongside his wife, Imelda Staunton. He recently appeared in King Lear on PBS alongside Anthony Hopkins and Emma Thompson.

Early life
Carter was born in Harrogate in the West Riding of Yorkshire, England. His mother was a land girl and later a school secretary, and his father worked for the Air Ministry. Carter attended Ashville College, Harrogate, where he was head boy in his final year, and the University of Sussex where he studied Law and appeared with the fledgling Drama Society, playing the title role in Serjeant Musgrave's Dance, the first student production at the newly-built Gardner Arts Centre theatre. He dropped out of university after two years to join a fringe theatre group in Brighton.

Career

Acting
He began acting professionally in "the early 1970s." When asked, "If you hadn't become an actor, what would you have done professionally?" he answered, "I wouldn't have pursued law—I'd actually dropped out of law into English, I'd even changed my course. But when the offer came from this fringe theatre group, the Brighton Combination, to leave university and join them for five quid a week, it was like a door opening, and there wasn't a moment's hesitation. I walked through that door and never looked back. I have never earned a penny from doing anything apart from acting. I have never had another job."

His first paid job for £5 a week with free board and lodging was in a play called Gum and Goo by Howard Brenton for the Brighton Combination. The play was first produced by the Brighton Combination (in Brighton) in 1969.

He appeared in Howard Brenton's Winter Daddykins in July 1968 for the Brighton Combination. It was directed by Barry Edwards, and Carter performed with Fiona Baker and Lily Sue Todd. This is probably the play referred to in Jenny Harris's website that took place on 9 July 1968 in the Brighton Combination's cafe. Jenny Harris was one of the initiators of the Brighton Combination. Jim Carter mentioned her in one interview as one who started the Brighton Combination. She was then head of the National Theatre's education department.

In 1970, he performed in the show Come Together at London's Royal Court Theatre together with the Brighton Combination and the Ken Campbell Roadshow along with other theatre personalities and groups. The Royal Court's Come Together Festival was on the cover page of Plays and Players magazine issue of December 1970. Scenes from this festival are also featured in this issue. The Come Together festival opened at the Royal Court Theatre on 21 October 1970 and contributed to one of the Royal Court's best years. The festival brought the avante-garde like the Brighton Combination and Ken Campbell into the Court. The Brighton Combination presented "The NAB Show", a politically oriented account of the National Assistance Board.

He first worked at the Combination Theatre Company in Brighton. Later he joined the Newcastle University Theatre where he played, among other parts, Estragon in Waiting for Godot. From 1974 to 1976 he toured America with the Ken Campbell Roadshow and on his return joined the Phoenix Theatre in Leicester. In 1977 he joined the National Theatre Company where he appeared as Dom Fiollo (sic) in The Hunchback of Notre Dame at the Cottesloe Theatre. In 1978 he became a member of the Young Vic Company appearing as Stephano in The Tempest, Buckingham in Richard III and Mephistopheles in Faust. In 1978 he went to America to study in a circus school where he learned juggling, unicycling and tightrope walking. From 21 May to 29 June 1980 he played Trebonius/Marullus/Poet in a Julius Caesar production of Riverside Studios directed by Peter Gill. He performs magic acts in cabarets. The Young Vic's Richard III production in 1978, which featured James Carter with, among others, Bill Wallis and Michael Attwell, was directed by Michael Bogdanov. He also performed in the Young Vic production of Bartholomew Fair in 1978. It was also directed by Michael Bogdanov.

He was a member of The Madhouse Company of London, a comedy troupe which performed in Boston in the 1970s; together with the late Marcel Steiner (1931–1999), Marc Weil and Tommy Shands. Ken Campbell was also associated with the group. The Madhouse Co. was an offshoot of the Ken Campbell's Roadshow that came to New York City and Boston. It broke up eventually and Steiner and Carter returned to England. The Madhouse Co. was in Cambridge, Massachusetts. in August 1976. The Madhouse Company of London was mentioned and its shows advertised and reviewed in several New York magazine issues from April 1974 to March 1975.
Marc Weil created The Madhouse Company of London in 1973.

In June to August 2005, he appeared in The President of an Empty Room at the National Theatre (written by Stephen Knight and directed by Howard Davies). When he did this he had not done theatre in 14 years. He considers his appearance in Richard Eyre's 1982 National Theatre revival of Guys and Dolls a significant moment. It was when he met his future wife, Imelda Staunton, who also appeared in this play. He considers Richard Eyre and Howard Davies two of his favourite directors. He was with the Brighton Combination still when it moved to London and opened a theatre called the Albany in Deptford. In his own words: "The Brighton Combination moved to London and started a theatre called the Albany in Deptford, and I was with them then."

In the early 1970s, the Brighton Combination, a touring fringe theatre group, became resident in the Albany Institute in Deptford, South East London. This was considered one of the great achievements of the Albany's then director Paul Curno. By fusing community work and the arts, Director Paul Curno and "The Combination" transformed the Albany's fortunes. This fusion still drives the Albany to this day. The Brighton Combination Company moved to become resident at the Albany in SE London in 1972 with a brief to set up community action and arts development projects. It combined artistic and cultural works with social activism.

He performed in the Lyric Theatre in Hammersmith, London in Jean Cocteau's The Infernal Machine (with Maggie Smith and with Simon Callow directing, 1986–87). Photos and a review of this play appeared in Plays and Players magazine in January 1987.

He also performed in The Mysteries: The Nativity, The Passion and Doomsday at the Cottesloe Theatre for the National Theatre in 1984 and 1985. Both performances were directed by Bill Bryden.

He appeared in Doug Lucie's Fashion in May–June 1990 at the Tricycle Theatre, directed by Michael Attenborough.

In the Royal Shakespeare Company's (RSC)The Wizard of Oz production, Carter played the Cowardly Lion while his wife, Imelda Staunton, played Dorothy. He considers playing a baddie dressed in black in the cowboy film Rustlers' Rhapsody one of the highlights of his career. The Wizard of Oz was directed by Ian Judge; it opened on 17 December 1987 at the RSC's Barbican Theatre. It played in repertory through 27 February 1988.

Other media
Carter narrates the pre-shows and announcements for the ride "Hex – The Legend of the Towers", at Alton Towers theme park in Staffordshire, United Kingdom.

He narrated the six-part series Home Front Britain, a documentary of life in Britain during World War II created and produced by the Discovery Channel and the British Film Institute. Home Front Britain was broadcast on Discovery Channel from 11 September 2009.

In 2013, Carter was featured in a Greenpeace campaign about the effects of global warming.

Personal life
Jim Carter and actress Imelda Staunton met in January 1982 during rehearsals for Richard Eyre's Guys and Dolls at the National Theatre. Carter was 34, Staunton was 26 and she considered him already old. According to Staunton, "We worked together for a year and it was a slow burn rather than a heady rush of passion." They married in 1983 and have one daughter, Bessie, born in 1993, who enrolled at the National Youth Theatre in 2010. Staunton says of Carter's acting, "He has never been the sort of actor who yearns to play Hamlet. Maybe it's because he came to acting from performing in the circus. He has always done just what he wants to do."

Staunton later proudly claimed that after 21 years of marriage, she and Carter had been apart for only three weeks. They have a terrier named Molly.

Carter is a former chairman of Hampstead Cricket Club, whose ground is near his home. On 18 September 2011 he organised the Hampstead Cricket Club's third Celebrity Cricket Match, an annual charity event.

Carter is a keen cyclist and has frequently ridden for charity causes. On 30 September 2011 he travelled with 25 other riders to Ghana for a 10-day trip which included six days of cycling to raise money for clean water in the small impoverished town of Tafo. It was his tenth charity ride. The previous nine (Jordan, Costa Rica, Laos, Vietnam, India, Namibia, Chile, Argentina and London to Paris—twice) were to raise money for the National Deaf Children's Society. He intended to raise at least £2,750, and ended up raising £8,670.

, Carter lives in West Hampstead, North London.

Honours
Carter was appointed Officer of the Order of the British Empire (OBE) in the 2019 New Year Honours for services to drama.

Filmography

Film

Television
{| class="wikitable"
|-
! Year
! Film
! Role
! Notes
|-
| 1980
|Fox
| Cliff Ryan
| 2 episodes
|-
| 1982
|Not The Nine O'Clock News
| Darts Referee
| 1 episode
|-
| 1984
| December Flower
| Dentist
| TV film
|-
| 1984
| Hiawatha
| Narrator
| TV film
|-
| 1985
| The Bill
| Stan
| 1 episode: "Death of a Cracksman"
|-
| 1985
| Widows 2
| Det. Insp. Frinton
| Mini-series (2 episodes)
|-
| 1986
| The Monocled Mutineer
| Spencer
|1 episode: "A Dead Man on Leave"
|-
| 1986
| Lost Empires
| Inspector Crabbe
|Mini-series (2 episodes)
|-
| 1986
| The Singing Detective
| Mr. Marlow
| 5 episodes
|-
| 1987
| Harry's Kingdom
| Bill
| TV film
|-
| 1988
| Star Trap
| Dr. Wax
| TV film
|-
| 1988
| A Very British Coup
| The Cabinet – Newsome
|Mini-series (2 episodes)
|-
| 1988
| Christabel
| Bausch
| TV film
|-
| 1988
| Hallmark Hall of Fame
| Pierre
| 1 episodes: "The Tenth Man"
|-
| 1988
| Thompson
|
| 1 episode: "Episode No.1.6"
|-
| 1989
| Precious Bane
| Sarn
| TV film
|-
| 1989–1994
| Screen Two
| Father
| 2 episodes
|-
| 1990
| A Sense of Guilt
| Richard Murray
| 7 episodes
|-
| 1990
| Zorro
| Colonel Mefisto Palomarez
| 2 episodes
|-
| 1990
| The Gravy Train
| Personip
| 1 episode: "Episode No.1.3"
|-
| 1991
| Incident in Judaea
| Afranius
| TV film
|-
| 1991
| Screen One
| Ray Galton
| 1 episode: "Hancock"
|-
| 1991
| Casualty
| Matthew Charlton
| 1 episode: "Dangerous Games"
|-
| 1991–1999
| Murder Most Horrid
| Various
| 3 episodes
|-
| 1992
| Great Performances
| Meinertzhagen
| 1 episode: "A Dangerous Man: Lawrence After Arabia"
|-
| 1992
| Between the Lines
| D.I. Dick Corbett
| 1 episode: "Lies and Damned Lies"
|-
| 1992
| Soldier Soldier
| Snr. Supt. Derek Tierney, RHKP
| 1 episode: "Lifelines"
|-
| 1992
| Stalin
| Sergo
| TV film
|-
| 1993
|Lipstick on Your Collar
| Inspector
| Mini-series
|-
| 1993
| A Year in Provence
| Ted Hopkins
| Mini-series (1 episode: "Room Service")
|-
| 1993
| The Comic Strip Presents...
| Commander
| 1 episode: "Detectives on the Edge of a Nervous Breakdown"
|-
| 1993
| Medics
| Hugh Buckley
| 1 episode: "Episode No.3.6"
|-
| 1993
| Resnick: Rough Treatment
| Grabianski
| TV film
|-
| 1993
| The Murder of James Bulger
| Narrator
| BBC Documentary
|-
| 1993–1994
| Minder
| Tompkins
| 2 episodes
|-
| 1994
| Pie in the Sky
| Alec Bailey
| 1 episode: "Passion Fruit Fool"
|-
| 1994
| Cracker
| Kenneth Trant
| 3 episodes
|-
| 1994
| Shakespeare: The Animated Tales
| Marc Anthony (voice)
| 1 episode: "Julius Caesar"
|-
| 1994
| Open Fire
| Dept. Chief Supt. Young
| TV film
|-
| 1994
| Midnight Movie
| Henry Harris
| TV film
|-
| 1995
| It Could Be You
| Wally "Lottery" Whaley
| TV film
|-
| 1995
| The Late Show
| Albert Knox
| Documentary (1 episode: "Sophie's World")
|-
| 1995
| Dangerfield
| Stephen Millwood
| 1 episode: "A Patient's Secret"
|-
| 1995
| Mrs. Hartley and the Growth Centre
| Inspector
| TV film
|-
| 1995
| Coogan's Run
| Fraser
| 1 episode: "Natural Born Quizzers"
|-
|1995
| The All New Alexei Sayle Show
| various roles
| Appeared in all six episodes in the second season
|-
| 1997
| Harpur and Iles
| Tenderness Mellick
| TV film
|-
| 1997
| The Missing Postman
| DS Lawrence Pitman
| TV film
|-
| 1997
| The Chest
| Roland Blood
| TV film
|-
| 1997
| Alas Smith and Jones
|
| 1 episode: "Episode No. 9.5"
|-
| 1997
| Ain't Misbehavin'''
| Maxie Morrell
| 3 episodes
|-
| 1997
| Bright Hair| Norman Devenish
| TV film
|-
| 1999
| Trial By Fire| Geoffrey Bailey
| TV film
|-
| 1999
| Tube Tales| Ticket Inspector
| TV film
|-
| 2000
| Arabian Nights| Ja'Far
| TV film
|-
| 2000
| The Scarlet Pimpernel| General La Forge
| TV series (1 episode: "Friends and Enemies")
|-
| 2001
| Jack and the Beanstalk: The Real Story| Odin, Member of Great Council of Mac Slec
| TV film
|-
| 2001
| The Way We Live Now| Mr. Brehgert
| TV mini-series (3 episodes)
|-
| 2002
| Inside the Murdoch Dynasty| Narrator
| TV film
|-
| 2002
| Dinotopia| Mayor Waldo Seville
| Mini-series (3 episodes)
|-
| 2002
| Dalziel and Pascoe | Ted Lowry
| 1 episode: "The Unwanted"
|-
| 2003
| Hornblower: Duty| Etheridge
| TV film
|-
| 2003
| Helen of Troy| Pirithous
| TV film
|-
| 2003
| Strange| Inspector Stuart
| 1 episode: "Asmoth"
|-
| 2003
| Trevor's World of Sport| Sir Frank Luckton
| 1 episode: "A Man's Game"
|-
| 2003
| Trial & Retribution| Dr. Jenkins
| 1 episode: "Suspicion: Part 1"
|-
| 2003
| Pompeii: The Last Day| Polybius
| TV film
|-
| 2003
| Cromwell: Warts and All| Oliver Cromwell
| TV film
|-
| 2003
| Midsomer Murders| Nathan Green
| TV series (1 episode: "The Fisher King")
|-
| 2004
| London| Henry Fielding
| TV film
|-
| 2004
| Von Trapped| Larry Lavelle
| TV film
|-
| 2004
| Blue Murder| Frank Evans
| 1 episode: "Up in Smoke"
|-
| 2006
| Aberfan: The Untold Story| Lord Robens
| TV documentary
|-
| 2006
| The Secret Life of Mrs. Beeton| Henry Dorling
| TV film
|-
| 2006
| The Wind in the Willows| Engine Driver
| TV film
|-
| 2007
| Recovery| Mr. Lockwood
| TV film
|-
| 2007
| Silent Witness| Malcolm Young
| 2 episodes
|-
| 2007–2009
| Cranford| Captain Brown
|Mini-series (7 episodes)
|-
| 2008
| Caught in a Trap| Brian Perkins
| TV film
|-
| 2009
| Red Riding: In the Year of Our Lord 1980| Harold Angus
|TV film
|-
| 2009
| Red Riding: In the Year of Our Lord 1983| Harold Angus
|TV film
|-
| 2010–2015
| Downton Abbey| Mr Charles Carson
| 52 episodesScreen Actors Guild Award for Outstanding Performance by an Ensemble in a Drama SeriesNominated – Primetime Emmy Award for Outstanding Supporting Actor in a Drama Series (2012-2015) Nominated – Satellite Award for Best Supporting Actor – Series, Miniseries or Television Film
|-
| 2013
| Secrets of the Stonehenge Skeletons|Narrator
|TV film documentary
|-
| 2013
| Secrets from the Workhouse|Narrator
| 2 episodes
|-
| 2013
| Queen Victoria and the Crippled Kaiser|Narrator
|TV documentary
|-
|2015
|"Building Hitler's Supergun"
|Narrator
|TV documentary
|-
|2017
|Knightfall| Pope Boniface VIII
|
|-
|2018
|King Lear|Earl of Kent
|Television film
|-
|2019–
|Inside the World's Greatest Hotels|Narrator
|TV series
|}

Theatre
His National Theatre performances (as James Carter):
 1. as Frollo in The Hunchback of Notre Dame (Cottesloe Theatre, 20 December 1977 – 14 January 1978)
 2. as Daui a fugitive/Guard/Second Cook in The Romans in Britain (Olivier Theatre, 10 October 1980 – 24 March 1981)
 3. as Nawadaha the storyteller in Hiawatha (Olivier Theatre, 25 November 1980 – December 1983)
 4. as Henry Straker in Man and Superman (Olivier Theatre, 17 January–October 1981)
 5. as Rebolledo a soldier in The Mayor of Zalamea (Cottesloe and Olivier Theatre, 4 August 1981(opening night at Cottesloe), Jim Carter performed at the Olivier, December 1981 – July 1982)
 6. as Chorus in The Oresteia (Olivier Theatre, 20 November 1981– )
 7. as Big Julie in Guys and Dolls (Olivier Theatre, 26 February 1982 – October 1983)
 8. as Hitler/SS Man Muller in Schewyk in the Second World War (Olivier Theatre, 16 September 1982 – March 1983)
 9. as Don Jose, the cigar taster in The President of an Empty Room (Cottesloe Theatre, 28 June 2005 – 27 August 2005)
 He was magic adviser, not one of the performers, in The Cherry Orchard (Cottesloe Theatre, 3 December 1985– )

His Royal Shakespeare Company (RSC) performances include:
 1. as the Judge in The Balcony (Barbican Theatre, 15 July 1987– )
 2. as Zekel, Cowardly Lion in The Wizard of Oz (Barbican Theatre, 17 December 1987 – 27 February 1988)

Summary of James "Jim" Carter's stage works:
 1. Winter Daddykins (for the Brighton Combination, July 1968)
 2. Gum and Goo (for the Brighton Combination, 1969)
 3. Come Together festival (for the Brighton Combination, Royal Court Theatre, October 1970– )
[Was with the Brighton Combination when it became resident in the Albany in Deptford, SE London, 1972]
 4. Waiting for Godot (for Newcastle University Theatre, ???)
 5. The Madhouse Company of London shows (offshoot of the Ken Campbell Roadshow) in New York and Massachusetts, 1974–76
 6. The Hunchback of Notre Dame (for the National Theatre, Cottesloe Theatre, December 1977 – January 1978)
 7. The Tempest (for the Young Vic Company, 1978)
 8. Richard III (for the Young Vic Company, 1978)
 9. Faust (for the Young Vic Company, 1978)
 10. Bartholomew Fair (for the Young Vic Company, 1978)
 11. Julius Caesar (Riverside Studios, May–June 1980)
 12. The Romans in Britain (for the National Theatre, Olivier Theatre, October 1980 – March 1981)
 13. Hiawatha (for the National Theatre, Olivier Theatre, November 1980 – December 1983)
 14. Man and Superman (for the National Theatre, Olivier Theatre, January–October 1981)
 15. The Mayor of Zalamea (for the National Theatre, Olivier Theatre, December 1981 – July 1982)
 16. The Oresteia (for the National Theatre, Olivier Theatre, November 1981)
 17. Guys and Dolls (for the National Theatre, Olivier Theatre, February 1982 – October 1983)
 18. Schweyk in the Second World War (for the National Theatre, Olivier Theatre, September 1982 – March 1983)
 19. The Mysteries: The Nativity, The Passion, and Doomsday (for the National Theatre, Cottesloe Theatre, 1984–85)
 20. The Infernal Machine (Lyric Hammersmith, 1986–87)
 21. The Balcony (for the Royal Shakespeare Company, Barbican Theatre, July 1987)
 22. The Wizard of Oz (for the Royal Shakespeare Company, Barbican Theatre, December 1987 – February 1988)
 23. Fashion (Tricycle Theatre, May–June 1990)
 24. Gasping (Theatre Royal, Haymarket, September 1990–February 1991)
 25. The President of an Empty Room'' (for the National Theatre, Cottesloe Theatre, June–August 2005)

References

External links

 
 Wish 143 BBC Film Network – short film starring Jim Carter
 Early Images of Jim Carter doing circus skills Photographer Sheila Burnett, taken 1984

1948 births
Living people
20th-century English male actors
21st-century English male actors
Actors from Harrogate
Alumni of the University of Sussex
English male film actors
English male musical theatre actors
English male television actors
Male actors from Yorkshire
Officers of the Order of the British Empire
Outstanding Performance by a Cast in a Motion Picture Screen Actors Guild Award winners
People educated at Ashville College